The 2020–21 Liga TDP season is the fourth-tier football league of Mexico. The tournament began on 25 September 2020 and finished on 3 July 2021.

Competition format 
The Tercera División (Third Division) is divided into 14 groups. For the 2009/2010 season, the format of the tournament has been reorganized to a home and away format, which all teams will play in their respective group. The 14 groups consist of teams which are eligible to play in the liguilla de ascenso for two promotion spots, teams who are affiliated with teams in the Liga MX, Liga de Expansión MX and Liga Premier and development teams, which are not eligible for promotion but will play that who the better team in a sixteen team filial playoff tournament for the entire season.

The league format allows participating franchises to rent their place to another team, so some clubs compete with a different name than the one registered with the FMF.

Due to the suspension of the previous season, for the 2020–21 season there will be four promotions to the Liga Premier. Two to Serie A and two to Serie B.

Group 1 
Group with 12 teams from Campeche, Quintana Roo, Tabasco and Yucatán. Note: Delfines Márquez was announced as a participant for the season, but was excluded from the league after week 15 for failing to fulfill his obligations as an affiliated club.

Teams

League table

Group 2 
Group with 15 teams from Puebla and Veracruz.

Teams

League table

Group 3 
Group with 10 teams from Chiapas and Oaxaca.

Teams

League table

Group 4 
Group with 20 teams from Mexico City and Greater Mexico City. Note: Promodep Central was enrolled in the season, but the team was retired after week 23.

Teams

League table

Group 5 

Group with 14 teams from Mexico City and State of Mexico.

Teams

League table

Group 6 
Group with 12 teams from Guerrero, Mexico City, Morelos, Puebla and State of Mexico.

Teams

League table

Group 7 
Group with 16 teams from Hidalgo, Mexico City, Puebla, State of Mexico and Tlaxcala.

Teams

League table

Group 8 
Group with 19 teams from Guanajuato, Jalisco, Michoacán and Querétaro. Note: Limsoccer F.C. was enrolled in the season, but was expelled after week 6 for failing to fulfill its obligations as an affiliate.

Teams

League table

Group 9 
Group with 13 teams from Aguascalientes, Durango, Guanajuato, Jalisco, Michoacán, San Luis Potosí and Zacatecas.

Teams

League table

Group 10 
Group with 20 teams from Colima and Jalisco.

Teams
{{Location map+ |Mexico Jalisco |width=500|float=right |caption=Location of teams in the 2020–21 Liga TDP Group 10 |places=

League table

Group 11 
Group with 17 teams from Jalisco, Nayarit and Sinaloa.

Teams
{{Location map+ |Mexico Jalisco |width=500|float=right |caption=Location of teams in the 2020–21 Liga TDP Group 11 (Jalisco and Nayarit)|places=

League table

Group 12 
Group with 8 teams from Coahuila, Nuevo León and Tamaulipas.

Teams

League table

Group 13 
Group with 8 teams from Chihuahua and Sonora.

Teams

League table

Group 14 
Group with 7 teams from Baja California. Although this group was officially announced by the League, no match was ever played between its members. The three places that belonged to this group in the play-offs were awarded to the three clubs with the best coefficient in the North Zone and who could not qualify through their own group.

Teams

League table

Promotion Play–offs
The Promotion Play–offs will consist of seven phases. Classify 64 teams, the number varies according to the number of teams in each group, being between three and eight clubs per group. The country will be divided into two zones: South Zone (Groups I to VII) and North Zone (Groups VIII to XIII). Eliminations will be held according to the average obtained by each team, being ordered from best to worst by their percentage throughout the season.

As of this season, the names of the knockout stages were modified as follows: Round of 32, Round of 16, Quarter-finals, Semifinals, Zone Final and Final, this as a consequence of the division of the country into two zones, for so the teams only face clubs from the same region until the final series.

Round of 32
The first legs were played on 26 and 27 May, and the second legs were played on 29 and 30 May 2021.

South Zone

North Zone

Round of 16
The first legs were played on 2 and 3 June, and the second legs were played on 5 and 6 June 2021.

South Zone

North Zone

Final stage

Zone Quarter–finals
The first legs were played on 9 and 10 June, and the second legs were played on 12 and 13 June 2021.

First leg

Second leg

Zone Semi–finals
The first legs were played on 16 June, and the second legs were played on 19 June 2021.

First leg

Second leg

Zone Finals
The first legs were played on 23 and 24 June, and the second legs were played on 26 and 27 June 2021.

First leg

Second leg

League Final
The match was played on 3 July 2021.

|}

Reserve and Development Teams 
Each season a table is created among those teams that don't have the right to promote, because they are considered as reserve teams for teams that play in Liga MX, Liga de Expansión and Liga Premier or are independent teams that have requested not to participate for the Promotion due to the fact that they are footballers development projects. The ranking order is determined through the "quotient", which is obtained by dividing the points obtained between the disputed matches, being ordered from highest to lowest.

Table 

Last updated: May 22, 2021 Source: Liga TDPP = Position; G = Games played; Pts = Points; Pts/G = Ratio of points to games played; GD = Goal difference

Play–offs

Round of 16 
The first legs were played on 26 May, and the second legs were played on 29 May 2021.

First leg

Second leg

Quarter–finals 
The first legs were played on 2 June, and the second legs were played on 5 June 2021.

First leg

Second leg

Semi-finals
The first legs were played on 9 and 10 June, and the second legs were played on 12 and 13 June 2021.

First leg

Second leg

Final
The first leg was played on 17 June, and the second leg was played on 20 June 2021.

First leg

Second leg

Regular Season statistics

Top goalscorers 
Players sorted first by goals scored, then by last name.

Source:Liga TDP

References

External links 
 Official website of Liga TDP

1